Ibrahim Ismail Chundrigar (15 September 1897 – 26 September 1960), best known as I. I. Chundrigar, was a Pakistani politician who served as the sixth prime minister of Pakistan, appointed in this capacity on 17 October 1957. He resigned due to a vote of no confidence on 11 December 1957, against him.

He was trained in constitutional law at the University of Bombay and was one of the Founding Fathers of the Dominion of Pakistan. Having served for just 55 days, Chundrigar's tenure is the third shortest served in the parliamentary history of Pakistan, after those of Shujaat Hussain and Nurul Amin, who served as prime minister for 54 and 13 days, respectively.

Biography

Early life and law practice

Ibrahim Ismail Chundrigar, a Muhajir, was born in Godhra, Gujarat, in India on 15 September 1897. He was the only child of his Kutchi Chundrigar family, a Muslim community in India. The Chundrigar community is of Arabian descent.

Chundrigar was initially schooled in Ahmedabad where he finished his matriculation and moved to Bombay for his higher studies. He attended the University of Bombay where he earned a BA degree in philosophy, and later the LLB degree in 1929. From 1929 till 1932, Chundrigar served as a lawyer for the Ahmedabad Municipal Corporation.

From 1932 until 1937, Chundrigar practiced civil law, and moved to practice and read law at the Bombay High Court in 1937, where he established his reputation. During this time, he became acquainted with Muhammad Ali Jinnah, sharing similar ideology, work ethics, and political views.

In 1935, Chundrigar was chosen by the Muslim League to give a response to the Government of India Act 1935 introduced by the British government in India. Notably, concerning the role of the Governor-General as head of state, Chundrigar denied that the Governor-General enjoyed the powers supposedly granted by the Act.

From 1937 till 1946, Chundrigar practiced and read law, taking several cases on civil matters where he advocated for his clients at the Bombay High Court.

Legislative career in India and Pakistan Movement

In 1936, Chundrigar joined the Muslim League. He was elected to the Bombay Legislative Assembly from the Ahmedabad district rural constituency in the 1937 provincial elections. From 1940 to 1945, he was president of the Bombay provincial Muslim League.

In 1946, he was elected to the assembly from a Muslim urban constituency in Ahmedabad. He was appointed as Commerce Minister under the presidential administrations of the Viceroys of India, Archibald Wavell (1946) and Louis Mountbatten (1946-47). Peter Lyon, a reader emeritus in international relations, described Chundrigar as a "close supporter" of Mohammad Ali Jinnah in the Pakistan Movement.

Public service in Pakistan

Diplomacy and governorships

After the partition of India by the act of the British Empire that established Pakistan, Chundrigar endorsed Liaquat Ali Khan's bid for the Premiership and was retained as the Commerce Minister in the administration of Prime Minister Liaquat Ali Khan on 15 August 1947.

In May 1948, Chundrigar left the Commerce Ministry and was appointed as Pakistan's Ambassador to Afghanistan. Although his appointment was favorably received in Afghanistan, Chundrigar was at odds with the Afghan government (supported by India as early as 1949) over the issue of Pakistan's north-west border with Afghanistan.

Chundrigar's tenure as ambassador was short. He was recalled to Pakistan by the Foreign Office, which viewed his inability to understand the Pashtun culture as a possible factor in fracturing Afghan-Pakistan relations. In 1950, Chundrigar was appointed Governor of Khyber-Pakhtunkhwa, a position he held until 1951. A Cabinet reshuffle in 1951 allowed him to be appointed as the Governor of Punjab but he was removed amid differences developed in 1953 with Governor-General M.G. Muhammad when he enforced martial law at the request of Prime Minister K. Nazimuddin to control violent religious riots that occurred in Lahore, Pakistan.

Law ministry in coalition administration

In 1955, Chundrigar was invited to join the central government of a three-party coalition: the Awami League, the Muslim League, and the Republican Party. He was appointed as Minister of Law and Justice. During this time, he also acted as a Leader of the Opposition, opposing the mainstream agenda presented by the Republican Party.

At the National Assembly, he established his reputation as more of a constitutional lawyer than a politician, and gained a lot of prominence in public for his arguments in favour of parliamentarianism when he pleaded the case of "Maulvi Tamizuddin vs. Federation of Pakistan".

Prime Minister of Pakistan (1957)

Third Shortest tenure as Prime Minister

After the resignation of Prime Minister Suhrawardy in 1956, Chundrigar was nominated as the Prime Minister and was supported by the Awami League, the Krishak Sramik Party, the Nizem-i-Islam Party, and the Republican Party. However, this coalition of mixed parties weakened Chundrigar's authority to run the central government, and divisions within the coalition would soon hamper his efforts to amend the Electoral College. On 18 October 1957, Chundrigar became the Prime Minister of Pakistan, receiving his oath of office from Chief Justice M. Munir.

At the first session of the National Assembly, Chundrigar presented his plan to reform the Electoral College which was met with great parliamentary opposition by even his Cabinet ministers from the Republican Party and the Awami League. With the Republican Party leadersparty president Feroz Khan and President of Pakistan Iskander Mirzaexploiting and manipulating the opponents of the Muslim League, a successful vote of no-confidence in the National Assembly led by the Republicans and the Awami Party effectively ended Chundrigar's term. He resigned on 11 December 1957.

Chundrigar served the third-shortest term of any Prime Minister in Pakistan: 17 October 195711 December 1957, 55 days into his term.

Death and reputation

In 1958, Chundrigar was appointed as president of the Supreme Court Bar Association, a position he held until his death. In 1960, Chundrigar traveled to Hamburg where he addressed the International Law Conference and suffered a hemorrhage while visiting in London. For treatment, he was taken to the Royal Northern Hospital and suddenly passed away. His body was brought back to Karachi in Pakistan, where he was buried in a local cemetery.

In his honour, the Government of Pakistan renamed McLeod Road in Karachi after him.

See also

 Constitutionalism in Pakistan
 Parliamentary history of Pakistan

References

External links
 I. I. Chundrigar
 Chronicles Of Pakistan

|-

|-

1897 births
1960 deaths
People from Panchmahal district
Politicians from Ahmedabad
University of Mumbai alumni
20th-century Indian philosophers
20th-century Indian lawyers
All India Muslim League members
Leaders of the Pakistan Movement
Pakistani people of Gujarati descent
Pakistani people of Arab descent
People from Karachi
First Pakistani Cabinet
Ambassadors of Pakistan to Afghanistan
Governors of Khyber Pakhtunkhwa
Pakistani lawyers
Governors of Punjab, Pakistan
Ambassadors of Pakistan to Turkey
Pakistan Muslim League politicians
Pakistani legal scholars
Lawyers from Karachi
Law Ministers of Pakistan
Pakistani philosophers
Prime Ministers of Pakistan
University of Karachi people
Members of the Pakistan Philosophical Congress
Deaths from bleeding
Scholars from Ahmedabad
Members of the Council of the Governor General of India